Dar Zarrouk is one of the palaces of the old town of Tunis. It is one of the largest historical palaces in Tunis.

Localization 
The palace is located on the street of Judges near the palace of Khurasanid dynasty's princes.

History 
Dar Zarrouk is an aristocratic house that belongs to the Zarrouk family, we can mention for example Abou Abdallah Mohamed Larbi Zarrouk, a minister under the reign of Hammuda ibn Ali.

The palace was constructed by a privateer and Dey Murad during the seventeenth century, and it was modified by the Zarrouk family during the eighteenth century.

Architecture 
It is composed mainly of a ground floor, the new owners added another house for their guests and a room to rest on the terraces. We can also find other outbuildings in the palace, such as a Grain Mill, a space to pray, and an inner garden.

Mohamed Zarrouk, son of the minister Mohamed Larbi Zarrouk built three more apartments during the nineteenth century.

References 

Zarrouk